Pramipexole, sold under the brand Mirapex among others, is medication used to treat Parkinson's disease (PD) and restless legs syndrome (RLS). In Parkinson's disease it may be used alone or together with levodopa. It is taken by mouth. Pramipexole is a dopamine agonist of the non-ergoline class. 

Pramipexole (and related D3-preferring dopamine agonist medications such as ropinirole) can induce "impulsive-compulsive spectrum disorders" such as compulsive gambling, punding,  hypersexuality, and overeating, even in people without any prior history of these behaviours. There have also been reported detrimental side effects related to impulse-control disorders resulting from off-label use of pramipexole or other dopamine agonists in treating clinical depression. The incidence and severity of impulse-control disorders for those taking the drug for depression is not fully understood because the drug has not been approved for the treatment of depression and the first major studies of its efficacy in treating anhedonic depression were conducted in 2022. There have been anecdotal reports of abrupt and severe personality changes related to impulsivity and loss of self-control in a minority of patients regardless of the condition being treated, although the incidence of these side effects is not yet fully known.

Pramipexole was approved for medical use in the United States in 1997. Use in pregnancy and breastfeeding is of unclear safety. It is available as a generic medication. In 2020, it was the 193rd most commonly prescribed medication in the United States, with more than 2million prescriptions.

Medical uses
Pramipexole is used in the treatment of Parkinson's disease (PD) and restless legs syndrome (RLS). Use in pregnancy and breastfeeding is of unclear safety.

It is occasionally prescribed off-label for depression. Its effectiveness as an antidepressant may be a product of its strong partial agonistic activity on and preferential occupation of dopamine D3 receptors at low doses (see table below); as well, the drug has been shown to desensitize the inhibitory D22 autoreceptors but not the postsynaptic D2 receptors, leading to an increase in dopamine and serotonin levels in the prefrontal cortex. Chronic administration of pramipexole may also result in desensitization of D3 autoreceptors, leading to reduced dopamine transporter function, "We show that prolonged administration of pramipexole (0.1mg/kg/day, 6 to 21 days) [equivalent to a low ~0.5 mg/day human dose], a preferential D3R agonist, leads to a decrease in DA [dopamine] uptake in mouse striatum that reflects a reduction in DAT [dopamine transporter] affinity for DA in the absence of any change in DAT density or subcellular distribution ... These observations provide novel insights into the long-term antiparkinson, antidepressant and additional clinical actions of pramipexole and other D3R agonists". 

As summarized in the following commentary, trials have shown mixed results, "Dopamine agonists, such as pramipexole—a relatively selective dopamine D3 receptor agonist—are thus potential treatments for depression, especially anhedonic depression. D3 receptors are found in the mesolimbic system, which in turn has been implicated in the motoric and hedonic deficits in depression ...  The first randomized controlled trial in patients with non-treatment-resistant major depressive disorder, by Corrigan et al., evaluated three dosages of pramipexole. The lowest dosage (0.375 mg/day) did not differentiate from placebo. The efficacy of the highest dosage (5.0 mg/day) was not evaluable, because of a 58% attrition rate. The third dosage (1.0 mg/day) was more effective than placebo ... Cusin et al. compared adjunctive adjunctive pramipexole with placebo in an 8-week randomized double-blind trial with 60 outpatients with major depression for whom at least one adequate antidepressant medication trial (mean, two trials) had failed. Although a modest statistically significant benefit of pramipexole over placebo was detected, neither the response rates (40% compared with 33%) nor the remission rates (27% compared with 23%) differed significantly between groups. Dosages were modest (mean=1.35 mg/day; maximum=2.0 mg/day) ... To our knowledge, this is the first case series of adjunctive pramipexole in patients with treatment-resistant depression for whom at least four previous treatments in the current episode had failed. Overall, 76% of the patients showed a meaningful clinical response that persisted, while 24% were intolerant or nonresponsive to pramipexole. Effective pramipexole dosages ranged from 0.75 to 5.0 mg/day. The mean effective dosage of pramipexole in responders and remitters (N=32) was 2.46 mg/day".

Side effects
Common side effects of pramipexole may include:

 Headache
 Peripheral edema
 Hyperalgesia (body aches and pains)
 Nausea and vomiting
 Sedation and somnolence
 Decreased appetite and subsequent weight loss
 Orthostatic hypotension (resulting in dizziness, lightheadedness, and possibly fainting, especially when standing up)
 Insomnia
 Hallucinations (seeing, hearing, smelling, tasting or feeling things that are not there), amnesia and confusion
 Twitching, twisting, or other unusual body movements
 Unusual tiredness or weakness
 Impulsive-compulsive behaviors: pramipexole (and related D3-preferring dopamine agonist medications such as ropinirole) can induce "impulsive-compulsive spectrum disorders" such as compulsive gambling, punding,  hypersexuality, and overeating, even in people without any prior history of these behaviours.
 Augmentation: Especially when used to treat restless legs syndrome, long-term pramipexole treatment may exhibit drug augmentation, which is "an iatrogenic worsening of RLS symptoms following treatment with dopaminergic agents" and may include an earlier onset of symptoms during the day or a generalized increase in symptoms.

Pharmacology
The activity profile of pramipexole at various sites has been characterized as follows:

While pramipexole is used clinically (see below), its D3-preferring receptor binding profile has made it a popular tool compound for preclinical research. For example, pramipexole has been used (in combination with D2- and or D3-preferring antagonists) to discover the role of D3 receptor function in rodent models and tasks for neuropsychiatric disorders. Of note, it appears that pramipexole, in addition to having effects on dopamine D3 receptors, may also affect mitochondrial function via a mechanism that remains less understood. A pharmacological approach to separate dopaminergic from non-dopaminergic (e.g. mitochondrial) effects of pramipexole has been to study the effects of the R-stereoisomer of pramipexole (which has much lower affinity to the dopamine receptors when compared to the S-isomer) side by side with the effects of the S-isomer.

Parkinson's disease is a neurodegenerative disease affecting the substantia nigra, a component of the basal ganglia. The substantia nigra has a high quantity of dopaminergic neurons, which are nerve cells that release the neurotransmitter known as dopamine. When dopamine is released, it may activate dopamine receptors in the striatum, which is another component of the basal ganglia. When neurons of the substantia nigra deteriorate in Parkinson's disease, the striatum no longer properly receives dopamine signals. As a result, the basal ganglia can no longer regulate body movement effectively and motor function becomes impaired. By acting as an agonist for the D2, D3, and D4 dopamine receptors, pramipexole may directly stimulate the underfunctioning dopamine receptors in the striatum, thereby restoring the dopamine signals needed for proper functioning of the basal ganglia.

Society and culture

Brand names 
Brand names include Mirapex, Mirapex ER, Mirapexin, Sifrol, Glepark, and Oprymea.

Research
Pramipexole has been evaluated for the treatment of sexual dysfunction experienced by some users of selective serotonin reuptake inhibitor (SSRI) antidepressants. Pramipexole has shown effects on pilot studies in a placebo-controlled proof of concept study in bipolar disorder. It is also being investigated for the treatment of clinical depression and fibromyalgia.

Derivatives
Derivatives of pramipexole include CJ-998, CJ-1037, CJ-1638, CJ-1639, D-264, D-440, and D-512.

Notes

References

External links 
 
 

Aphrodisiacs
Dopamine agonists
Thiazoles
Pfizer brands
Boehringer Ingelheim
Wikipedia medicine articles ready to translate
Secondary amines
Amines
Propyl compounds